Alma M. Aldrich (May 6, 1837 in Kirtland, Ohio – November 1, 1902 in Burlington, Wisconsin) was a member of the Wisconsin State Assembly. His father was a politician and justice of the peace.

Career
Aldrich was a member of the Assembly in 1878. He had previously been elected to the Walworth County, Wisconsin Board of Supervisors in 1871 and went on to become its Chairman.

References

People from Kirtland, Ohio
People from Burlington, Wisconsin
Members of the Wisconsin State Assembly
County supervisors in Wisconsin
1837 births
1902 deaths
19th-century American politicians